Golarcheh may refer to:
 Golarcheh-ye Olya
 Golarcheh-ye Sofla